The 1928 Grand National was the 87th renewal of the Grand National horse race that took place at Aintree Racecourse near Liverpool, England, on 30 March 1928.

Before the race, Tipperary Tim's amateur jockey, William Dutton, heard a friend call out to him: "Billy boy, you'll only win if all the others fall!" And they did, as all of the 41 other starters fell during the race.

The 1928 National was run during misty weather conditions with the going very heavy. As the field approached the Canal Turn on the first circuit, Easter Hero fell, causing a pile-up from which only seven horses emerged with seated jockeys. By the penultimate fence this number had reduced to three, with Great Span leading ahead of Billy Barton and Tipperary Tim. Great Span's saddle then slipped, leaving Billy Barton in the lead until he too fell. Although Billy Barton's jockey Tommy Cullinan managed to remount and complete the race, it was Tipperary Tim who came in first at outside odds of 100/1. The 10-year-old was trained by Joseph Dodd for its owner, Harold Kenyon.

With only two riders completing the course, 1928 set the record for the fewest finishers in a Grand National.

Finishing order

Non-finishers

References

https://web.archive.org/web/20131227085539/https://www.sportsbookguardian.com/horse-racing/grand-national/winners
http://the-grand-national.co.uk/history/1920/

 1928
Grand National
Grand National
20th century in Lancashire